14-Methoxydihydromorphinone is a semi-synthetic opioid related to 14-methoxymetopon (14-MM), an opioid with a Ki of 0.15 nM, and 14-O-methyloxymorphone (14-OMO) with a Ki of 0.10 nM. By contrast, oxymorphone has a Ki of 0.97 nM and morphine one of 6.55 nM (all at mu receptors). This suggests that both 14-OMO and 14-MM have a higher mu/kappa selectivity than oxymorphone.

See also
 Metopon

References

4,5-Epoxymorphinans
Mu-opioid receptor agonists
Semisynthetic opioids